The Ventura Oil Field is a large and currently productive oil field in the hills immediately north of the city of Ventura in southern California in the United States.  It is bisected by California State Route 33, the freeway connecting Ventura to Ojai, and is about eight miles (13 km) long by two across, with the long axis aligned east to west.  Discovered in 1919, and with a cumulative production of just under a billion barrels of oil as of 2008, it is the tenth-largest producing oil field in California, retaining approximately 50 million barrels in reserve, and had 423 wells still producing.   it was entirely operated by Aera Energy LLC.

Geographic setting

The oil field is on and beneath the ranges of hills northwest, north and northeast of the city of Ventura.  The Ventura River, flowing down from Ojai, cuts through the field, and empties into the Pacific Ocean at Ventura.  Native vegetation in the hills is predominantly chaparral and coastal sage scrub, and riparian woodland is found along the course of the Ventura River.  Terrain on the hills is steep, and the roads to well pads, tanks, and other infrastructure make numerous switchbacks.  Most of the field is hidden from view from the city because of the first steep range of hills.  The oil field is one of several following the east-west trend of the Transverse Ranges at this point:  to the west are the San Miguelito Oil Field and the Rincon Oil Field, and to the east, across the Santa Clara River valley, the large South Mountain Oil Field adjacent to Santa Paula and the smaller Saticoy Oil Field along the Santa Clara River east of Saticoy.  To the north are the smaller Ojai and Santa Paula fields.  Total productive area of the field, projected to the surface, encompasses .

California State Route 33, which follows the route of the Ventura River through the hills and through the field, provides much of the vehicular access, and other access roads come directly from the city of Ventura to the south.

Climate in the area is Mediterranean, with cool, rainy winters and mild, dry summers, cooled by morning coastal clouds. Runoff from the oil field is into the Ventura River, although some of the eastern portions of the field drain south into the Santa Clara River.

Geology

This anticline dips steeply on both sides, with the dip angle ranging from 30 to 60 degrees, resulting in a series of rock beds resembling a long house with a gabled roof, under which oil and gas collect in abundance. Within this feature, the primary petroleum-bearing unit is the Pico Formation, a sedimentary unit of turbidite sands of high porosity (16 to 20 percent)). Additionally, oil is found in the underlying Santa Margarita Formation. Eight different oil-bearing zones have been identified by number, 1st through 8th based on depth, with the 2nd zone the first to be discovered, in March 1919 by the Shell Oil Company.

The underlying Monterey Formation is presumed to be the source of the oil accumulations in the Ventura field, as well as the other two fields in the same geologic trend.  The Monterey Formation is rich in organic matter, averaging 3-5 percent but reaching 23 percent in some areas.  Oil likely migrated upwards during the late Pliocene, becoming trapped in the folds and structural traps of the higher rocks of the anticline which form an impermeable caps.  Some of the oil-bearing zones, such as the 4th and 5th, are capped by the Barnard Fault, which provides an additional structural trap.  Even with the impermeable caps and structural traps, there are enough breaks in the structure for significant natural tar seeps to occur; indeed the entire region is riddled with natural seeps, and tar was used by the native Chumash peoples as a sealant for their watercraft.

Oil gravity and sulfur content is similar in all pools in the field, with an API gravity of 29-30 and approximately 1 percent sulfur by weight.

History, production and operations

The area was worked initially in 1885, followed by Ventura County Power Company drilling 7 shallow gas wells in 1903. In May 1916 the first commercially viable well, No. "Lloyd" 1, was drilled by State Consolidated Oil Company to a depth of 2,555 feet. Initial production consisted of 100 barrels a day.

A major real estate boom in Ventura resulted with the development of the oil fields in the 1920s. The affordability of automobiles and the building of better roads to Los Angeles and the opening of the Rincon Sea Level Road to Santa Barbara in 1913 also contributed to the rapid growth of the city.

While the field was productive from the earliest years, it had a reputation for difficulty, and challenged the technological skill of the early 20th-century drillers. Later wells reached even greater depths, as drillers attempted to find the bottom of this extraordinarily productive but challenging field.

Production at the field peaked in the 1950s, at which time the field became the 12th most productive in the United States.  In 1954 alone the field produced over 31 million barrels of oil.  As production began to decline after 1954, technologies for enhanced recovery became available.  Waterflooding – the reinjection of produced water to increase reservoir pressure, allowing wells with diminishing returns to flow more freely – commenced in most zones in the late 1950s and 1960s, and continues in the present.

Aera Energy LLC, a joint venture of ExxonMobil and Shell Oil Co., eventually acquired the entire field, by consolidation of their predecessor company's operations and acquisition of the few remaining independent operators in the area.  Their neighbor on the abutting San Miguelito and Rincon fields to the west is Vintage Petroleum, a subsidiary of Occidental Petroleum.

In 2009 Aera was still producing an average of 11,600 barrels of oil a day from the field, making the company the largest oil and gas producer in Ventura County. Aera's permits, approved from 1948 to 1956, were granted without environmental impact reviews. Shell and ExxonMobil agreed in 2022 to sell the all the assets of Aera to a German asset management group IKAV.

Notes

References

 California Oil and Gas Fields, Volumes I, II and III. Vol. I (1998), Vol. II (1992), Vol. III (1982). California Department of Conservation, Division of Oil, Gas, and Geothermal Resources (DOGGR). 1,472 pp. Ventura Oil Field information pp. 572–574. PDF file available on CD from www.consrv.ca.gov.
 California Department of Conservation, Oil and Gas Statistics, Annual Report, December 31, 2006.
 Keller, Margaret.  Ventura Basin Province, U.S. Geological Survey Digital Data Series DDS-30, Release 2, one CD-ROM, 19 p. + supporting maps, figures, and tables.  Available here

Oil fields in California
Geology of Ventura County, California
Geography of Ventura County, California
Landmarks in Ventura County, California